Yewlands Academy (formerly known as Yewlands Secondary School and Yewlands Technology College) is a secondary school with academy status located in the Grenoside area of Sheffield, South Yorkshire, England. Until March 2018, it was managed by the Wakefield City Academies Trust. Following the collapse of the trust, it was taken over by the Brigantia Learning Trust who manage the nearby schools Hinde House School and Longley Park Sixth Form.

The school was originally located on three sites; Elm, Yew and Willow. The school was rebuilt as part of the Building Schools for the Future programme and reopened in September 2009. The school has under 900 students.

Notable former pupils
Olympic Long Jumper Sheila Sherwood (née Parkin) who won Silver at the Mexico Games in 1968, and a Commonwealth Gold two years later.

References

External links
 
 

Academies in Sheffield
Secondary schools in Sheffield
2009 establishments in England